Jett Kenny (born 1994) is an Australian ironman, model and television personality.

The son of ironman Grant Kenny and competitive swimmer Lisa Curry, Kenny has competed in professional surf lifesaving competitions since the age of six.

In 2016, Kenny was signed to Vivien's Models.

In 2018, Kenny competed in the Nine Network's Australian Ninja Warrior and was one of eight celebrities to appear on the Seven Network's The Real Full Monty.

In 2019, Kenny competed in Network Ten's Dancing with the Stars, where he placed fourth.

It was announced in 2021 that Kenny would be part of the SAS TV show.

Personal life 
Kenny prompted some public debate about parental discipline in 2018 after posting a video to his Instagram account of a misbehaving child in a doctor's waiting room with the caption "give your kid a goddam smack". Media commentator Jane Caro criticised Kenny's attitude and said that parents already have a tough job without receiving gratuitous advice from strangers.

In September 2020, Kenny's older sister Jaimi Lee died after a long illness.

References 

Australian surf lifesavers
Australian models
Australian television personalities
1994 births
Living people